The El Hierro giant lizard (Gallotia simonyi machadoi) is a subspecies of lacertid (wall lizard) that can be found on the island of El Hierro, one of the Canary Islands. It is considered to be a subspecies of Gallotia simonyi, Simony's lizard. The subspecies was once present throughout much of the island and on the small offshore , but is now confined to a few small areas of cliff with sparse vegetation. The species was also successfully reintroduced to the Roque Chico de Salmor in 1999, and subsequent reintroductions have taken place at Julan and at la Dehesa.(Miras & Pérez-Mellado 2005b)

Adults are dark grey to brown in colour, with two rows of pale orange patches running along its sides. Its belly is mostly brown, but has an orange to red colouration towards the middle. Older El Hierro giant lizards are mainly black with some grey. Males are larger than females. It is the animal symbol of the island of El Hierro.

The Hierro giant lizard is omnivorous. It eats plants - notably verode and Lavandula abrotanoides - as well as insects (ARKive 2006). Mating begins in May and 5 to 13 eggs are laid from June until the end of August. Their eggs hatch after 61 days.

Status and conservation
In 1974, the German amateur herpetologist Werner Bings discovered a surviving population of this species on El Hierros mainland (Böhme & Bings 1975). This was subsequently determined to be a distinct subspecies, 100 years after the species was first described (López-Jurado 1989).

The population of this species is about 300 to 400 animals in the wild (including re-introduced populations), and it is classified as critically endangered by the 2006 IUCN Red List. This giant lizard's major threat is predation by feral cats, and possibly also by dogs and rats.

A recovery plan for the Hierro giant lizard has been developed and the United Nations and the Canary Islands Autonomous Government funded a program for the captive breeding and re-introduction of the Hierro giant lizard to its original natural habitat, including the Roque Chico de Salmor. Control of feral cats has been stopped in 2002, but according to the IUCN continued control of feral cats should be resumed to allow population recovery.

The Hierro giant lizard is protected by national and international legislation. It is listed on Annex IV of the European Union's Habitats Directive (EC 2003) and on Appendix I of CITES.

References

External links
 ARKive (2006): Hierro giant lizard (Gallotia simonyi). Downloaded on 18 May 2006.
 Barahona, F.; Evans, S. E.; Mateo, J.A.; García-Márquez, M. & López-Jurado, L.F. (2000): Endemism, gigantism and extinction in island lizards: the genus Gallotia on the Canary Islands. J. Zool. 250(3): 373–388.  (HTML abstract)
 Bischoff, Wolfgang (2000): DGHT-AG Lacertiden aktuell: Rieseneidechsen auf La Gomera. Version of 2000-MAY-23. Retrieved 2007-FEB-25.
 Böhme, W. & Bings, Werner (1975): Zur Frage des Überlebens von Lacerta s. simonyi Steindachner. Salamandra 11(1): 39–46. [Article in German]
 Diaz, Carlos Naeslund & Bischoff, Wolfgang (1994): Studien am Roque Chico de Salmor bei El Hierro (Kanaren): 1. Mögliche Ursachen für das Aussterben von Gallotia simonyi, 2. Die Artzugehörigkeit seiner Geckos (Tarentola). Salamandra 30(4): 246–253. [Article in German] HTML abstract
 European Commission (EC) (2003): Council Directive 92/43/EEC on the Conservation of natural habitats and of wild fauna and flora. Annex IV - Animal and plant species of community interest in need of strict protection. Treaty of Accession 2003. PDF fulltext
 European Environment Agency (2006a): European Nature Information System (EUNIS): Species Factsheet: Gallotia simonyi. Downloaded on 24 Feb 2007.
 European Environment Agency (2006b): European Nature Information System (EUNIS): Species Factsheet: Gallotia simonyi machadoi. Downloaded on 24 Feb 2007.
 López-Jurado, L.F. (1989): A new Canarian lizard subspecies from Hierro island (Canarian Archipelago). Bonner Zoologische Beiträge 40: 265–272.
 Maas, Peter H.J. (2006): The Extinction Website: Extinctions in Europe. Downloaded on 18 May 2006.
 Maca-Meyer, N.; Carranza, S.; Rando, J.C.; Arnold, E.N. & Cabrera, V.M. (2003): Status and relationships of the extinct giant Canary Island lizard Gallotia goliath (Reptilia: Lacertidae), assessed using ancient mtDNA from its mummified remains. Biol. J. Linn. Soc. 80(4): 659–670.  (HTML abstract)

External links
 lacerta.de: Gallotia simonyi machadoi image gallery. Retrieved 2007-FEB-25.

Gallotia
Reptiles of the Canary Islands
Reptiles described in 1989
El Hierro